Foreign Policy Analysis is a quarterly peer-reviewed academic journal published by Oxford University Press on behalf of the International Studies Association.  The journal was established in 2005. The current editors-in-chief are Klaus Brummer (Catholic University of Eichstätt-Ingolstadt, Germany) and Brian Lai (University of Iowa, USA). The journal covers the process, effects, causes and outputs of foreign policy decision-making in both comparative and case-specific manners.

According to the Journal Citation Reports, the journal has a 2017 impact factor of 1.386.

References

External links 
 

Wiley-Blackwell academic journals
Oxford University Press academic journals
English-language journals
Publications established in 2005
Quarterly journals
International relations journals